In mathematical representation theory, the Harish-Chandra transform is a linear map from functions on a reductive Lie group to functions on a parabolic subgroup.

The Harish-Chandra transform fP of a function f on the group G is given by 

where P = MAN is the Langlands decomposition of a parabolic subgroup.

References

Representation theory of Lie groups